Halls Gap is a town in Victoria, Australia.  It is located on Grampians Road, adjacent to the Grampians National Park, in the Shire of Northern Grampians local government area. The town is set in the Fyans Valley at the foot of the Wonderland and Mount William ranges. At the 2016 census Halls Gap had a population of 430. The approximate driving time from Melbourne is 3 hours.

History
The first settler was Charles Browning Hall who set out in search of a suitable grazing run when he found the cattle market at Port Phillip overstocked in 1841. Establishing a station just east of the Grampians in a spot known as "Mokepilli" to the indigenous inhabitants the Mukjarawaint. Halls Gap was originally located at where the now Lake Bellfield Reservoir is now located.

Hall discovered the gap by following Aboriginal tracks.

Hall's Gap Post Office opened on 3 February 1893, closed in 1896, and reopened in 1902.

Indigenous Peoples 
The indigenous people of the area are the Mukjarawaint., who referred to the area as  "Mokepilli". The indigenous people speak the djab Wurrung language

Today
Its chief industry is tourism, due to its location in the Grampians National Park. Australia's longest running Aboriginal cultural centre, Brambuk, is located in the town. There is now a local chemist in town located at the Stoney Creek shops.

Golfers play at the course of the Halls Gap Golf Club on Red Gum Lease Track.

Food and Wine Festival
Halls Gap is home to one of Australia's longest running food and wine festivals, held over the first weekend of May every year.  Launched in 1992, Grampians Grape Escape is a hallmark event for Victoria and provides food and wine offerings by more than 100 local artisan producers, live music and family entertainment.

Climate

References

External links

 Official Halls Gap Tourism website
 Grampians Grape Escape website

Towns in Victoria (Australia)
Wimmera
Grampians (region)